"Baby I'm Ready" is the title of a number-one R&B single by LeVert. The song spent one week at number one on the US R&B chart in July 1991 and is the group's final number one on the chart.

References

See also
List of number-one R&B singles of 1991 (U.S.)

1991 songs
1991 singles
Atlantic Records singles
LeVert songs
Songs written by Gerald Levert
Contemporary R&B ballads
1990s ballads